Xiao Siwen (? — 970) was a Chinese politician who served as the chancellor and northern commissioner for military affairs of the Liao dynasty. He was the father of Xiao sisters (Xiao Hunian, Lady Xiao and Xiao Yanyan). However, for the sake of the overall situation and family glory, he agrees to make his youngest daughter Xiao Yanyan married with Yelü Xian and in 969, after Yanyan become the Liao Empress, Xiao then honoured as King of Wei (魏王). Later, when he a accompanied Xian Siwen on the hunt, he was assassinated by Gao Xun's people.

Family
Wife: Yelü Lübugu, Princess of Yan (耶律吕不古 燕国公主)
Daughter: Xiao Hunian (953 - 1009) (萧胡辇)
Son In-law: Yelü Yanchege (935 - 972) (耶律罨撒葛)
Daughter: Lady Xiao (萧氏)
Son In-law: Yelü Xiyin (耶律喜隱)
Daughter: Xiao Yanyan (953 - 1009) (蕭燕燕) – also known as Xiao Chuo (蕭綽)
Son In-law: Emperor Jingzong of Liao (1 September 948 - 13 October 982) (遼景宗) – had 4 sons and 3 daughters.
Adopted son: Xiao Jixian (萧继先) – Actually was Xiao Siwen's nephew.

In popular culture
Portrayed by Liu Yijun in the 2020 Chinese TV series The Legend of Xiao Chuo.

References

Year of birth unknown
970 deaths
Liao dynasty people
10th-century Khitan people
Xiao clan
Liao dynasty politicians